Garcinia hermonii is a species of flowering plant in the family Clusiaceae. It is found only in Sri Lanka where it is known as මඩොල් (madol) in Sinhala.

References

Endemic flora of Sri Lanka
Conservation dependent plants
hermonii
Taxonomy articles created by Polbot